Midlothian was a constituency of the Scottish Parliament (Holyrood). It elected one Member of the Scottish Parliament (MSP) by the plurality (first past the post) method of election. Also, however, it was one of nine constituencies in the Lothians electoral region, which elected seven additional members, in addition to nine constituency MSPs, to produce a form of proportional representation for the region as a whole.

For the 2011 Scottish Parliament election, the Midlothian constituency was abolished, with the creation of two new constituencies called Midlothian North and Musselburgh, and Midlothian South, Tweeddale and Lauderdale.

Electoral region 

The other eight constituencies of the Lothians region from 1999 to 2011 were: Edinburgh Central, Edinburgh East and Musselburgh, Edinburgh North and Leith, Edinburgh Pentlands, Edinburgh South, Edinburgh West, Linlithgow and Livingston.

The region covered the City of Edinburgh council area, the West Lothian council area, part of the Midlothian council area, and part of the East Lothian council area.

Constituency boundaries and council area 

The Midlothian constituency was created at the same time as the Scottish Parliament, in 1999, with the name and boundaries of the then existing Westminster constituency. In 2005, however, Scottish Westminster (House of Commons) constituencies were mostly replaced with new constituencies.

The Holyrood constituency was one of two covering the Midlothian council area. The other constituency, Tweeddale, Ettrick and Lauderdale, covered a western portion of the Midlothian council area, and straddles its boundary with the Scottish Borders council area. Tweeddale, Ettrick and Lauderdale was within the South of Scotland electoral region.

Boundary review 

Following their First Periodic review of constituencies to the Scottish Parliament, the Boundary Commission for Scotland recommended extending the current Midlothian constituency into a newly formed seat of Midlothian North and Musselburgh with the western boundary to the south of Auchendinny. The other constituency now covering the Midlothian council area is a modified Midlothian South, Tweedale, and Lauderdale constituency.

Member of the Scottish Parliament

Election results

Footnotes 

Scottish Parliament constituencies and regions 1999–2011
1999 establishments in Scotland
Constituencies established in 1999
2011 disestablishments in Scotland
Constituencies disestablished in 2011
Dalkeith
Bonnyrigg and Lasswade
Politics of Midlothian